Poniec  is a town in western Poland, situated in the southern part of the Greater Poland Voivodeship. The town has about 3,000 inhabitants. It is the capital of Gmina Poniec (commune) in Gostyń County.

History

Poniec dates back to the 10th century, when it was part of the emerging Polish state. The oldest known mention comes from 1108. It was granted town rights before 1309. It was a private town, administratively located in the Kościan County in the Poznań Voivodeship in the Greater Poland Province of the Polish Crown. Crafts, especially clothmaking, developed and the town prospered until the Swedish invasion of Poland in 1655–1660. The Battle of Poniec occurred nearby on 28 October 1704 during the Great Northern War.

After the Second Partition of Poland, in 1793 it was annexed by Prussia. Regained by Poles in 1807, it was included in the short-lived Polish Duchy of Warsaw, in 1815 it was re-annexed by Prussia. The local population was subjected to harsh Germanisation policies, however local Poles established various organizations, including a local branch of the "Sokół" Polish Gymnastic Society. Many inhabitants took part in the Greater Poland uprising (1918–19), after which Poniec was reintegrated with Poland in 1919, shortly after it regained independence.

During the invasion of Poland, which started World War II, German troops entered the town on 6 September 1939. The Polish population was subjected to arrests, executions and expulsions. In the following months, many residents were imprisoned in the town hall. On 21 October 1939 the Germans carried out a public execution of local Poles. It was one of many massacres of Poles committed by Germany on 20-23 October 1939 across the region in attempt to pacify and terrorize the Polish population. Over 300 Poles were expelled to the General Government, mostly to Tarnów. First Polish families were expelled in December 1939. Many inhabitants were taken to forced labour or murdered in concentration camps. The town was captured by the Soviets in January 1945 and afterwards restored to Poland.

From 1975 to 1998, it was administratively located in the Leszno Voivodeship.

Transport
There is a train station in Poniec.

Sports
The town's most notable sports club is Piast Poniec with football, volleyball, table tennis and futsal sections.

Notable people
Edmund Charaszkiewicz (1895-1975), intelligence officer

References

External links

Official Poniec website

Cities and towns in Greater Poland Voivodeship
Gostyń County
10th-century establishments in Poland
Populated places established in the 10th century
Nazi war crimes in Poland